Nossa palaearctica is a moth in the family Epicopeiidae first described by Staudinger in 1887. It is found in the Russian Far East and China. The Global Lepidoptera Names Index gives this name as a synonym of ''Nossa nelcinna.

References

Moths described in 1887
Epicopeiidae